Bozhong Mountain, also known by its Chinese name Bozhong Shan, is a mountain mentioned in the Book of Documents. It is said to be the source of the headwaters of the Han River, the namesake of the Han Dynasty and the Han Chinese. The mountain has been identified as a mountain in southern Shaanxi province's Ningqiang County or as another mountain on the border between Gansu province's Tianshui and Li County in the People's Republic of China. Both mountains are referred to as Bozhong Mountain.

Notes

References

Mountains of Gansu
Mountains of Shaanxi